

424001–424100 

|-bgcolor=#f2f2f2
| colspan=4 align=center | 
|}

424101–424200 

|-id=200
| 424200 Tonicelia ||  || Antonio Celia Miro (born 1969), a Spanish software engineer and advanced amateur astronomer. || 
|}

424201–424300 

|-bgcolor=#f2f2f2
| colspan=4 align=center | 
|}

424301–424400 

|-bgcolor=#f2f2f2
| colspan=4 align=center | 
|}

424401–424500 

|-bgcolor=#f2f2f2
| colspan=4 align=center | 
|}

424501–424600 

|-bgcolor=#f2f2f2
| colspan=4 align=center | 
|}

424601–424700 

|-bgcolor=#f2f2f2
| colspan=4 align=center | 
|}

424701–424800 

|-bgcolor=#f2f2f2
| colspan=4 align=center | 
|}

424801–424900 

|-bgcolor=#f2f2f2
| colspan=4 align=center | 
|}

424901–425000 

|-bgcolor=#f2f2f2
| colspan=4 align=center | 
|}

References 

424001-425000